Porter may refer to:

Companies
 Porter Airlines, Canadian regional airline based in Toronto
 Porter Chemical Company, a defunct U.S. toy manufacturer of chemistry sets
 Porter Motor Company, defunct U.S. car manufacturer
 H.K. Porter, Inc., a locomotive manufacturer

People
Porter (name), an English surname and given name (including a list of persons with the name)

Occupations
 Porter (carrier), a person who carries objects
 Porter (college), a member of staff in many of the colleges of the Universities of Cambridge, Lancaster, Oxford and Durham
 Porter (railroad), a railroad employee who assists passengers at stations
 Porter (monastery), the monk appointed to be the one who interacts with the public
 Pullman porter, a railroad employee who assists passengers on sleeping cars
 Deal porter, a dockworker specializing in handling baulks of softwood
 Doorman (profession), American English for the occupation known in British English as porter
 Groom Porter, official in charge of gambling in the Tudor court; the owner or operator of a gaming hall
 Hospital porter, an assistant in a hospital
 Kitchen porter, a plongeur or marmiton, position in the Brigade de cuisine of a commercial kitchen
 Ostiarius, formerly known as doorkeeper or porter, one of the minor orders of the Roman Catholic ministry
 Bar-back, sometimes known as porter, a bartender's assistant

Places

United Kingdom
 Porter Brook, river in Sheffield, England
 The Little Don River also known as the Porter, a tributary of the River Don in South Yorkshire, England

United States
 Malone-Porter, Washington
 Porter, Indiana
 Porter, Maine
 Porter, Minnesota
 Porter, Missouri
 Porter, New York
 Porter, Ohio
 Porter, Oklahoma
 Porter, Texas
 Porter, West Virginia
 Porter, Wisconsin, a town
 Porter County, Indiana
 Porter Heights, Texas
 Porter's Mills, Wisconsin, a ghost town
 Porter Square, in Cambridge, Massachusetts
 Porter (MBTA station), at that square
 Porter Township, Michigan (disambiguation) (three places)
 Porter Township, Pennsylvania (disambiguation) (seven places)

Space
 Porter (lunar crater)
 Porter (Martian crater)

Vehicles
 Hyundai Porter, a pickup truck
 Mazda Porter, a series of small trucks
 Piaggio Porter, electric van
 Pilatus PC-6 Porter, Swiss aircraft

Other uses
 Porter (band), a Mexican indie band
 Porter (beer), a type of beer
 Porter (magazine), a fashion publication
 The Porter (horse), an American Thoroughbred racehorse and leading sire
 The Porter (TV series), a Canadian television series that debuted in 2022
 Porter College, a residential college at the University of California, Santa Cruz
Porter, a character in the Thomas and Friends TV series

See also 
 Port (disambiguation)
 Miss Porter's School, also known as Porter's, a school in Connecticut, United States
 Porter's Regiment, American Revolutionary War soldiers under Colonel Porter
 Porters (disambiguation)
 Justice Porter (disambiguation)